Spix's woodcreeper (Xiphorhynchus spixii) is a species of bird in the woodcreeper subfamily (Dendrocolaptinae). The elegant woodcreeper was previously considered a subspecies of the Spix's woodcreeper. It is endemic to humid lowland forest in the eastern Amazon of Brazil.

The common name commemorates the German naturalist Johann Baptist von Spix (1782-1826).

References

Spix's woodcreeper
Birds of Brazil
Birds of the Amazon Basin
Endemic birds of Brazil
Spix's woodcreeper
Taxa named by René Lesson
Taxonomy articles created by Polbot